Arcani may refer to:
 Arcani, Gorj, a commune in Romania
 Areani, possibly a misspelling of Arcani, Late Roman secret agents in Roman Britain